National Security Service could refer to:

National Security Service (Armenia)
National Security Service (Kazakhstan)
National Security Service (Maldives)
National Security Service (Somalia)
National Security Service (Turkey)
National Security Service (United States)
National Security Service (Uzbekistan)